Cedar Fork is a stream in Franklin County in the U.S. state of Missouri. It is a tributary of Boeuf Creek.

The community of Detmold lies along Boeuf Creek approximately one mile northeast of the confluence.

Cedar Fork was named for the cedar timber along its course.

See also
List of rivers of Missouri

References

Rivers of Franklin County, Missouri
Rivers of Missouri